Fredric Tommy Lundqvist (born 3 August 1976) is a Swedish former professional footballer who played as a defender. He is best remembered for his time in Allsvenskan with GIF Sundsvall, but also represented Lira BK, IFK Luleå, and Viking FK during a career that spanned between 1994 and 2007. A full international between 2003 and 2005, he won five caps for the Sweden national team.

Club career 
Starting his career with Gammelstads IF, Lundqvist played in Division 2 and Division 1 with Lira BK and IFK Luleå before making his Allsvenskan debut for GIF Sundsvall during the 2000 season. In 2005, he signed a contract with the Tippeligaen club Viking FK. In early 2007 he announced his retirement from professional football after having appeared in only five games with Viking FK after a long battle with an Achilles injury.

International career 
Lundqvist represented the Sweden U19 team six times before making his full international debut for Sweden on 18 February 2003 in a friendly game against North Korea. He was on the bench for two UEFA Euro 2004 qualifying games against San Marino and Poland, but never appeared in a competitive game for Sweden. He won his fifth and final cap in a friendly game against Mexico on 26 January 2005.

Career statistics

Club

International

Honours 
Individual

 Årets Giffare (GIF Sundsvall Player of the Year): 2001

References 

Living people
1976 births
Swedish footballers
Allsvenskan players
GIF Sundsvall players
Sweden international footballers
IFK Luleå players
Association football defenders
Viking FK players
Eliteserien players
Swedish expatriate footballers
Expatriate footballers in Norway
Swedish expatriate sportspeople in Norway
People from Luleå
Sportspeople from Norrbotten County